The Elbert L. Carpenter House is a historic house in the Loring Park neighborhood of Minneapolis, Minnesota, United States.  It was designed by notable local architect William Channing Whitney in the Colonial Revival style.  The house is significant not only for its architecture, but also for its resident, a businessman in the lumber industry.  Elbert Carpenter (1862–1945) helped to organize the Minneapolis Symphony Orchestra, now known as the Minnesota Orchestra. The Minneapolis Labor Review noted, "it was to him that everyone looked when stringent times in the world of work, trade and finance brought stringent times to the world of music. He never failed to respond with both financial support and ingenious plans for getting the Symphony through the storm of every depression."

The house was listed on the National Register of Historic Places in 1977.  It was listed for its local significance in industry and music for Carpenter's achievements, and in architecture for its Georgian Revival design by William Channing Whitney.

References

External links
 1923 biography of Elbert L. Carpenter

Houses completed in 1906
Houses in Minneapolis
Houses on the National Register of Historic Places in Minnesota
National Register of Historic Places in Minneapolis
1906 establishments in Minnesota